Castletroy College is a Community School in Newtown, Castletroy, County Limerick, Ireland. It was founded in 2000. It has over 1,200 students.

Achievements

Sport
The school's girls' basketball team have won the Senior Munster Cup final four times in a row and the senior all Ireland three times in a row. The school's girls' soccer team have been in more than 6 All-Ireland finals, winning more than half of them. A number of players from the school have also played at provincial and county level.

In March 2008, Castletroy won both Munster Schools rugby premier competitions, the Munster Schools Junior Cup and the Munster Schools Senior Cup. Limerick hurler Paudie Fitzmaurice is a former teacher at the school. Competitive swimmer, Gráinne Murphy also attended the college.

Other events
In 2004, Castletroy pupils Aisling O'Brien and Naomi Guerin won the regional "Young Chef of the year" awards. In the same year, Patrick Collison, a student of the school, won second prize at the EsatBT Young Scientist of the Year Awards. Patrick and his brother John Collison are now billionaire entrepreneurs.

Another student, Galin Ganchev, won twice the Irish Maths Olympiad and the Fergus Gaines Cup (2006 & 2008), got silver medals at the 5th European Union Science Olympiad (2007) and the Irish EU Science Olympiad (2007), a silver medal at the Balkan Maths Olympiad (2008), and was a co-winner of the PRISM Irish National Maths Contest (2007). Subsequently he went to Cambridge University to study Mathematics.

In December 2010, a Leaving Certificate student Aislinn Hayes was awarded a medal from the Institute of Physics for coming joint first in the Physics 2010 examination.

Notable alumni

References

External links
 
 Castletroy College 2008 website archive

Secondary schools in County Limerick
Educational institutions established in 2000
2000 establishments in Ireland